Mere Yaar Ki Shaadi Hai is a 2002 Indian Hindi-language romantic comedy directed by Sanjay Gadhvi and produced by Yash Chopra and Aditya Chopra under the banner Yash Raj Films. The film starred Uday Chopra, Tulip Joshi (in her debut), Jimmy Sheirgill and Bipasha Basu. The film was  partly inspired by My Best Friend's Wedding (1997).

Plot 
Sanjay Malhotra lives in Mumbai with his friend Riya. He receives a phone call from his childhood friend Anjali Sharma who shocks him with the news that she is getting married. Unfortunately, Sanjay has loved Anjali for years. Jealous and frustrated Sanjay makes his way to Anjali with an intention to stop her marriage.

Sanjay goes to Anjali's home and soon meets her groom, Rohit Khanna. Sanjay, being constantly reprimanded and lovingly chided for his playboy behaviour and no one takes him seriously.  Sanjay then begins to scheme. He organises a bachelor party for Rohit and all the men in the family. Rohit ends up completely drunk. He picks up on the fact that Sanjay is out to stop his marriage and vows to make sure that Sanjay fails in this. Sanjay and Riya try to make Anjali jealous to make her understand she loves him. At Anjali's Mehendi ceremony Riya tells Anjali that she and Sanjay were never lovers. Anjali reveals that she loved Sanjay all her life but the latter never understood it but considered her as only his best friend. Rohit is heartbroken when he learns of this. Rohit tells Anjali's mom that she and her daughter had the same choice for Anjali's groom, Anjali always wanted Sanjay to marry Anjali from deep within their heart. On knowing his absence in her wedding, Anjali leaves for Mumbai to meet Sanjay in her bridal dress. She asks him why he left. Sanjay expresses his love for her saying that he can't see her marrying anyone else. Finally, both express their love for each other. Even though Rohit fails in his challenge, he is happy for their love. Sanjay and Anjali marry, Rohit and Ria sing and dance at their best friend's wedding.

Cast 
 Uday Chopra as Sanjay Malhotra (Sanju)
 Tulip Joshi as Anjali Sharma Malhotra (credited as Sanjana)
 Nitesh Pandey as Ajit Ahuja
 Jimmy Shergill as Rohit Khanna
 Bipasha Basu as Ria Bhalla, Sanjay’s roommate 
 Dina Pathak as Dadi
 Deven Verma as Hari Taya
 Tannaz Irani as Anushka Sharma, Anjali’s sister
 Resham Tipnis as Neelima Agarwal 
 Saurabh Shukla as Kunal Sharma, Anjali's Mama
 Parikshit Sahni as Rohan Khanna, Rohit's Dad
 Bindu as Kapila Tai
 Alok Nath as Vishnu Sharma, Anjali’s father
 Neena Kulkarni as Gayatri Sharma, Anjali’s mother
 Tushar Dalvi as Naren Karyekar 
 Shamita Shetty in a special appearance in the item number Sharara

Soundtrack 

The film's music is by the duo Pritam and Jeet Gannguli, with lyrics by Javed Akhtar. According to the Indian trade website Box Office India, with around 11,00,000 units sold, this film's soundtrack album was the year's twelfth highest-selling. The first single track "Mere Yaar Ki Shaadi Hai" sung by Alka Yagnik, Sonu Nigam, and Udit Narayan  was released on 25 April 2002. The soundtrack album was released by Yash Raj Films on 7 June 2002.

Critical response
Taran Adarsh of IndiaFM gave the film 2 stars out of 5, writing "On the whole, MERE YAAR KI SHAADI HAI is a decent entertainer that should appeal more to the city audience." Sukanya Verma of Rediff.com wrote "Mere Yaar Ki Shaadi Hai is good, lighthearted, clean entertainment. It might just prove a welcome break from the two films on Shaheed Bhagat Singh releasing the same day. Derek Elley of Variety wrote "At every level (casting, budget, songs, production values), pic is one notch down from a Chopra super-production, but it still makes a fine entry-level Bollywood pic. And anyone who thinks “Monsoon Wedding” was actually representative of contemporary Bollywood should just take a look at the real thing here. Manish Gajjar of BBC.com wrote "My advice is that you take heed of Yash Chopra's offer because this invitation is definitely not going to disappoint when it releases at UCI Telford with English subtitles."

References

External links 
 

2002 films
2000s Hindi-language films
Indian buddy films
Indian romantic musical films
Films directed by Sanjay Gadhvi
Yash Raj Films films
Films featuring songs by Pritam
Films scored by Jeet Ganguly
Films about Indian weddings
Films shot in Mumbai
Films set in Mumbai
Films set in Dehradun